South Labuhanbatu Regency (Kabupaten Labuhanbatu Selatan, alternatively Kabupaten Labuhan Batu Selatan) is a regency of North Sumatra, Indonesia, created in 2007 by being carved out of the existing Labuhanbatu Regency The new South Labuhanbatu Regency covers an area of 3,595.9 square kilometres and according to the 2010 census it had a population of 277,673, which rose to 314,094 at the 2020 Census. Its administrative headquarters are at Kotapinang.

Administrative districts 
The regency is divided administratively into five districts (kecamatan), tabulated below with their areas and their populations at the 2010 Census and the 2020 Census. The table also includes the location of the district centres.

References 

North Sumatra
Regencies of North Sumatra